Misael Escuti Rovira (20 December 1926 – 3 January 2005) was a Chilean footballer of Italian ancestry, remembered for being the key player with the Chile national team that reached third place in the 1962 FIFA World Cup tournament.

Personal life

References

External links
 

1926 births
2005 deaths
People from Copiapó
Chilean footballers
Chile international footballers
Chilean people of Italian descent
Santiago National F.C. players
Badminton F.C. footballers
Colo-Colo footballers
Chilean Primera División players
1962 FIFA World Cup players
Association football goalkeepers